Berry is a town in Fayette County, Alabama, United States. At the 2010 census the population was 1,148, down from 1,238 at the 2000 census.

History
The town was named for Thompson Berry, a local landowner. The town incorporated in 1883 as "Berry Station". However, the first elections were not held until 1899 and the town did not appear on the U.S. Census until 1900. In the 1920s, it shortened its name to Berry. On April 27, 2011, the town was struck twice by tornadoes.

Geography
Berry is located in southeastern Fayette County at  (33.657836, -87.606084). Alabama State Route 18 runs through the town, leading west  to Fayette, the county seat, and east  to Oakman.

The town lies between the North River and its tributary, Cedar Creek. It is part of the watershed of the Black Warrior River, the principal tributary of the Tombigbee River.

Demographics

At the 2000 census there were 1,238 people, 516 households, and 352 families living in the town. The racial makeup of the town was 91.44% White, 6.38% Black or African American, 0.32% Native American, 1.05% from other races, and 0.81% from two or more races. 1.70% of the population were Hispanic or Latino of any race.
Of the 516 households 32.8% had children under the age of 18 living with them, 49.0% were married couples living together, 15.5% had a female householder with no husband present, and 31.6% were non-families. 29.7% of households were one person and 13.0% were one person aged 65 or older. The average household size was 2.40 and the average family size was 2.96.

The age distribution was 26.9% under the age of 18, 9.5% from 18 to 24, 25.8% from 25 to 44, 24.7% from 45 to 64, and 13.0% 65 or older. The median age was 36 years. For every 100 females, there were 88.7 males. For every 100 females age 18 and over, there were 81.7 males.

The median household income was $20,214 and the median family income  was $26,083. Males had a median income of $28,500 versus $20,714 for females. The per capita income for the town was $12,635. About 31.4% of families and 32.1% of the population were below the poverty line, including 44.1% of those under age 18 and 30.2% of those age 65 or over.

2010 census
At the 2010 census there were 1,148 people, 506 households, and 316 families living in the town. The population density was 110 people per square mile (42/km2). There were 596 housing units at an average density of 53.2 per square mile (20/km2). The racial makeup of the town was 90.8% White, 7.4% Black or African American, 0.0% Native American, .6% from other races, and 1.2% from two or more races. .8% of the population were Hispanic or Latino of any race.
Of the 506 households 26.7% had children under the age of 18 living with them, 41.5% were married couples living together, 16.0% had a female householder with no husband present, and 37.5% were non-families. 35.2% of households were one person and 14.6% were one person aged 65 or older. The average household size was 2.27 and the average family size was 2.90.

The age distribution was 24.5% under the age of 18, 9.2% from 18 to 24, 22.5% from 25 to 44, 28.8% from 45 to 64, and 15.0% 65 or older. The median age was 40.1 years. For every 100 females, there were 94.9 males. For every 100 females age 18 and over, there were 93.6 males.

The median household income was $20,792 and the median family income  was $32,350. Males had a median income of $26,346 versus $26,250 for females. The per capita income for the town was $12,960. About 20.8% of families and 27.1% of the population were below the poverty line, including 19.9% of those under age 18 and 29.6% of those age 65 or over.

Education
The town of Berry has one elementary school and one high school. Berry Elementary School has grades Pre-K-6. Berry High School includes grades 7-12. The mascot for both schools is the wildcat.

Industry
Berry has the headquarters of Stallion Trailers, Pittsburgh-Midway Chevron Mine, and Piggly Wiggly Grocers. Small businesses such as shops and restaurants also contribute to the town's economy. The Bank of Berry, founded in 1911, was privately owned until 2002, when it was purchased by First National Bank of Hamilton.

Notable people
 Jamelle Folsom, former First Lady of Alabama (1948-1951, 1955-1959)
 Bettye Kimbrell, master folk artist for quilting
 Fuller Kimbrell, member of the Alabama State Senate from 1947 to 1955
 Hugh C. Bailey, president of Valdosta State University (Valdosta, Georgia) from 1978 to 2002

References 

Towns in Fayette County, Alabama
Towns in Alabama